Olga Erikovna Ivanova (born 23 March 1993 in Verkhneuralsk) is a Russian taekwondo practitioner.

Ivanova won the gold medal in the women's heavyweight (+73 kg) class at the 2013 World Taekwondo Championships, which was Russia's first gold medal at WTF World Championships.
    
In September 2013, Ivanova rescued a woman from a minor dispute by kicking the attacking man in the stomach, knocking him down for enough time for the victim to walk away.

References

External links
 

1993 births
Living people
Russian female taekwondo practitioners
Taekwondo practitioners at the 2010 Summer Youth Olympics
Taekwondo practitioners at the 2015 European Games
European Games medalists in taekwondo
European Games bronze medalists for Russia
Universiade medalists in taekwondo
Universiade bronze medalists for Russia
European Taekwondo Championships medalists
World Taekwondo Championships medalists
Medalists at the 2011 Summer Universiade
Sportspeople from Chelyabinsk Oblast
21st-century Russian women